Begusarai District is one of the thirty-eight districts of the Indian state of Bihar. The city of Begusarai is its administrative headquarters and is part of the Munger division.

History
Begusarai was established in 1870 as part of Munger District. In 1972, it was given district status. Simaria village is the birthplace of famous Hindi poet Ramdhari Singh Dinkar. Begusarai is part of the historic Mithila or Mithilanchal region. Begusarai is notable for its milk, sweets and dairy products.

Geography
The district lies on the northern bank of the river Ganges. Begusarai district is a part of Munger division. It is located at latitudes 25.15N & 25.45N and longitudes 85.45E & 86.36E. The Ganges river separates Begusarai district from Patna District and Munger District.

Flora and Fauna 
It is Asia's largest freshwater oxbow lake. In November 2020, the Ministry of Environment, Forest and Climate Change (MoEFCC) declared it the first Ramsar site in Bihar.

Demographics

According to the 2011 census Begusarai district has a population of 2,970,541, roughly equal to the nation of Armenia or the US state of Mississippi. This gives it a ranking of 128th in India (out of a total of 640). Its population growth rate over the decade 2001-2011 was 26.44%. Begusarai has a sex ratio of 895 females for every 1000 males, and a literacy rate of 63.87%. 19.18% of the population lives in urban areas. Scheduled Castes and Scheduled Tribes make up 14.55% and 0.05% of the population respectively.

At the time of the 2011 Census of India, 79.77% of the population in the district spoke Hindi, 9.53% Urdu and 2.43% Maithili as their first language. 7.94% of the population spoke 'Others' under Hindi.

Politics 

|}
Current Member of Legislative council
Bihar Vidhan Parishad (Begusarai-Khagaria)

Administration

Cities and towns
 Begusarai
 Barauni
 Barauni IOC Township
 Matihani
 Mansurchak
 Teghra
 Manjhaul
 Bakhri
 Ballia
 Cheria Bariyarpur
 Birpur

Villages
 

 Bachwara
 Bara
 Balahpur 
 Begampur
 Bhairwar
 Bihat
 Khamhar
 Khodawandpur
 Madhurapur
 Meghaul Pethiya
 Mohanpur
 Manjhaul
 Mobarakpur Taraiya
 Naula
 Nayatol
 Panhas
 Raghunathpur
 Rajaura
 Ramdiri
 Sahebpur Kamal
 Seuri
 Shitalrampur
 Simaria
 Siuri
 Tara
 Vandwar

Economy

Barauni is the major industrial town in the district. It has big industries like Barauni Refinery, Barauni Thermal Power Station, Urvarak Nagar Barauni ,Garhara locomotive shed and Pepsi bottling plant . Shri Krishna Singh wanted to built an industrial corridor from Begusarai-Bakhtiyarpur-Fatuha, so he looked to construct Rajendra Setu in Mokama. Begusarai is one of the largest milk-consuming districts in India. Sudha dairy plant is also one of the biggest exporters of milk all over Bihar.

Transportation

Barauni Junction is the major railway junction. Another major railway station is Begusarai. Begusarai is well connected by road to other parts of Bihar and the country.

Railways 
Barauni Junction is one of the important stations in Bihar. It is a junction and is connected to India's main cities of New Delhi, Kolkata, Mumbai and Chennai via broad gauge routes. Begusarai railway station is located in Begusarai city.

Roads 

National Highway 28 starts at Barauni and leads to Lucknow. National Highway 31 passes through the district and leads to Guwahati. Both National Highways have junctions here. It is also called Assam Road. Many small city buses pass through here. Begusarai district also has Rajendra Setu on the Ganges near Simariya, which was the first railroad bridge in independent India on the river Ganges. The first six-lane bridge is under construction in Begusarai on the Ganges in Simaria. It will be complete by October 2023.

Education
Rashtrakavi Ramdhari Singh Dinkar College of Engineering (RRSDCE) was laid on 22 December 2013 by Nitish Kumar, paving way for the eighth government engineering college in Bihar. G D College is a notable undergraduate and postgraduate degree college of the district.

Notable people

Ramdhari Singh Dinkar, poet, essayist, patriot and academic.
Kranti Prakash Jha, Bollywood actor
Sriti Jha, TV actress
Kanhaiya Kumar, politician and leader of the Indian National Congress (former All India Students Federation and Communist Party of India )
Mathura Prasad Mishra 
Ram Sharan Sharma, historian
Balmiki Prasad Singh, former Governor of Sikkim 
Bhola Singh, politician, leader of Bharatiya Janta Party (former Member of Parliament from Begusarai Lok Sabha constituency)
Rakesh Sinha, politician, professor and Member of Parliament, Rajya Sabha
Rajeev Kumar, political & 
social worker , Founder & Secretary & National Secretary General Garhpura Namak Satyaagrah Gaurav Yatra Samiti

References

External links
 Official website

Further reading
 
 Archaeological Geography of the Ganga Plain: The Lower and the Middle Ganga
 Early Medieval Indian Society: A Study in Feudalisation
 Naulagarh
 Begusarai Information Portal

 
1972 establishments in Bihar
Darbhanga division
Districts of Bihar
Populated places in Mithila, India